Watermelon salad is a summer salad made with watermelon, and usually mint, feta and a simple vinaigrette dressing, with other ingredients like cucumber and red onion. Olives or baby arugala can be added. There are many variations, with some adding tomatoes and parsley together with the mint. Some versions omit the vinaigrette and serve it simply with olive oil and a splash of lemon juice. Goat cheese can be substituted for the feta, and additionally satsuma fruits and chopped pecans can be added to the basic salad.

References

Cheese dishes
Salads
Fruit salads
Independence Day (United States) foods
Watermelons